The 5th Infantry Division "Cosseria" was an infantry division of the Royal Italian Army during World War II. The Cosseria was named for the Battle of Cosseria fought in 1796 during the War of the First Coalition. The division recruited primarily in Liguria and its infantry regiments were based in Ventimiglia (89th) and Sanremo (90th), while the artillery regiment was based in Albenga.

History 
The division's lineage begins with the Brigade "Salerno" established in Bologna on 1 November 1884 with the 89th and 90th infantry regiments.

World War I 
During World War I the brigade fought initially on the Italian front, but in April 1918 it was transferred together with the Brigade "Alpi", Brigade "Brescia", and Brigade "Napoli" to the Western Front in France. There the brigades fought in the Third Battle of the Aisne, Second Battle of the Marne, Battle of Saint-Thierry, and the Hundred Days Offensive.

On 1 November 1926 the brigade was disbanded and its two regiments were transferred to the other brigades: the 89th Infantry Regiment "Salerno" to the V Infantry Brigade and the 90th Infantry Regiment "Salerno" to the I Infantry Brigade. The V Infantry Brigade, which also included the 41st Infantry Regiment "Modena" and the 42nd Infantry Regiment "Modena", was the infantry component of the 5th Territorial Division of Genoa, which also included the 29th Artillery Regiment. On 20 October 1929 the division moved to Imperia and consequently changed its name to 5th Territorial Division of Imperia. On 1 January 1935 the division changed its name to 5th Infantry Division "Cosseria".

Second Italo-Ethiopian War 
In preparation for the Second Italo-Ethiopian War the division was mobilized on 19 August 1935 with the 41st and 42nd infantry regiments and the 29th Artillery Regiment and shipped in September to Benghazi in Libya. In early January 1936 the division was shipped to Eritrea and moved to Adi Quala, where it guarded the supply lines of the Italian divisions fighting in Ethiopia. In March, it started to advance to Addi Onfito, reaching Axum in April 1936 and then continuing to the Adwa area. In September 1936 the division was repatriated.

World War II 
On 25 March 1939 the division ceded all its regiments, except the 89th Infantry Regiment "Salerno", to the newly activated 37th Infantry Division "Modena". On the same date the V Infantry Brigade was dissolved and the 90th Infantry Regiment "Salerno" was transferred from the 1st Infantry Division "Superga" to the Cosseria. Furthermore the Cosseria raised the 37th Artillery Regiment and the division's three regiments - 89th and 90th infantry, 37th artillery - changed their names to "Cosseria".

Invasion of France 
On 10 June 1940, it was deployed on the French border, in the area between Cima Longoira and the sea. On 20 June 1940 the Cosseria assaulted French positions at the bridges of Via Aurelia (Corso Francia) and Ponte San Luigi over the Ro San Luigi river near the coast, and on the San Paolo mountain pass near I Colletti, in the Ventimiglia commune. Although the attack through over the bridges was repulsed, the Cosseria succeeded in taking the pass of San Paolo on 22 June 1940. As a result the French forces defending the bridges over the Ro San Luigi and in the Menton area were outflanked, with Italian units capturing rural areas between Castellar and Roquebrune. The Cosseria remained in the occupied France until the middle of August 1940, when it was transferred for coastal defence duties in western Liguria.

Eastern Front 
The division was one of ten divisions that served on the Eastern Front as part of the Italian Army in Russia. The Cosseria division received orders to move from Liguria to Eastern Ukraine in June 1942. Before leaving Italy the Cosseria exchanged artillery regiments with the 103rd Infantry Division "Piacenza", as the Piacenza's 108th Motorized Artillery Regiment was equipped with modern 75/18 Mod. 34 howitzers, which were considered to be of better use in the Soviet Union than the World War I vintage 75/27 Mod. 06 field guns of the Cosseria's 37th Artillery Regiment. The Cosseria arrived in Horlivka in Southern Ukraine in the beginning of July 1942 and initially was used as reserve of the Italian XXXV Army Corps. Following the attacking forces the Cosseria arrived in Stalino (today Donetsk) on 15 July 1942 and in Luhansk on 25 July 1942. It crossed the Seversky Donets river at Stanytsia Luhanska. In the first half of August the Cosseria was transferred to the front-line on the Don river, to the north of the 3rd Infantry Division "Ravenna", taking positions between Novaya Kalitva and Verhny Mamon. From 20 August until 26 August 1942, the Cosseria repelled a Soviet assault without giving up any ground. Further Soviet attacks at Krasno-Orehovo and Derezovka on 11 September 1942, succeeded in pushing back the Cosseria troops, but all losses were recovered by Italian counter-attacks on 12 September 1942. Soon after, the division was moved back to the reserve.

Operation Little Saturn 
On 12 December 1942 Soviet forces began Operation Little Saturn and the Cosseria was hit by powerful Soviet attacks. By 24 December 1942 the division was badly decimated and relieved from frontline duty by German units. The Cosseria's remaining men were partly used to reinforce the 3rd Infantry Division "Ravenna", and partly used to protect supply lines around Rovenky. The rapidly deteriorating situation forced the Cosseria's remnants to retreat to the south-west, first maintaining a front-line, and then in several separate columns. The street fighting began in Rovenky on 2 January 1943. During the Soviet Voronezh Front's operations in the Upper Don area under Golikov, Soviet cavalry struck out very successfully for Valuiki and under the pale winter sun on 19 January the horsemen in black capes and flying hoods charged down the hapless Italians, killing and wounding more than a thousand before the brief resistance by the fleeing, hungry and frostbitten men of the 5th Infantry Division ended. 

The few remaining soldiers of the Cosseria then reached Izium, where they linked up with other Axis forces. The further retreat route was through Kharkiv, Okhtyrka, Romny, Pryluky, Nizhyn, finally reaching Novobelitsa at the Southern outskirts of Gomel on 7 March 1943. The division was repatriated in May 1943 and moved to Tuscany, where it started to re-form. On 25 July 1943 the division was assigned for police duties at Sesto San Giovanni. After the announcement of the Armistice of Cassibile on 8 September 1943 the division was dissolved by invading German forces on 12 September 1943.

Organization

Second Italo-Ethiopian War 1935 
 5th Infantry Division "Cosseria"
 41st Infantry Regiment "Modena"
 42nd Infantry Regiment "Modena"
 29th Artillery Regiment
 2x Artillery groups
 DV Machine Gun Battalion
 V Replacements Battalion
 5th Engineer Company

Notes: 
 Each Army Division in the Ethiopian Campaign had a Pack-Mules unit of 3000 mules and three Regimental Trucks units (20 light trucks each).
 For the campaign in Ethiopia the Cosseria was organized as a binary division with two infantry regiments.

World War II 1941 

When the division was deployed to the Soviet Union it consisted of the following units:

  5th Infantry Division "Cosseria", in Imperia
 89th Infantry Regiment "Cosseria", in Ventimiglia
 Command Company
 3x Fusilier battalions
 Support Weapons Company (65/17 infantry support guns)
 Mortar Company (81mm Mod. 35 mortars)
 90th Infantry Regiment "Cosseria", in Sanremo
 Command Company
 3x Fusilier battalions
 Support Weapons Company (65/17 infantry support guns)
 Mortar Company (81mm Mod. 35 mortars)
 37th Artillery Regiment "Cosseria", in Albenga (transferred to the 103rd Infantry Division "Piacenza" in June 1942)
 Command Unit
 I Group (100/17 howitzers)
 II Group (75/27 field guns)
 III Group (75/27 field guns)
 1x Anti-aircraft battery (20/65 Mod. 35 anti-aircraft guns)
 Ammunition and Supply Unit
 108th Artillery Regiment "Cosseria" (transferred from the 103rd Infantry Division "Piacenza" in June 1942)
 Command Unit
 I Group (105/28 guns)
 II Group (75/18 Mod. 35 howitzers)
 III Group (75/18 Mod. 35 howitzers)
 87th Anti-aircraft Battery (20/65 Mod. 35 anti-aircraft guns)
 305th Anti-aircraft Battery (20/65 Mod. 35 anti-aircraft guns)
 Ammunition and Supply Unit
 V Mortar Battalion (81mm Mod. 35 mortars; detached to the 9th Infantry Division "Pasubio" during the campaign in the Soviet Union)
 CV Mortar Battalion (81mm Mod. 35 mortars; raised in April 1942)
 V Anti-tank Battalion (formed during the deployment to the Eastern Front)
 72nd Anti-tank Battery (75/39 anti-tank guns; attached during the deployment in the Soviet Union)
 135th Anti-tank Company (47/32 anti-tank guns)
 355th Anti-tank Company (47/32 anti-tank guns; transferred from the 155th Infantry Division "Emilia" for the deployment in the Soviet Union)
 5th Telegraph and Radio Operators Company
 23rd Engineer Company
 47th Medical Section
 118th Field Hospital
 119th Field Hospital
 513th Field Hospital
 515th Field Hospital
 105th Surgical Unit
 5th Truck Section
 48th Supply Section (expanded to 48th Supply Unit for the deployment to the Soviet Union)
 134th Transport Section
 248th Transport Section
 53rd Bakers Section
 13th Carabinieri Section
 14th Carabinieri Section
 5th Infantry Division Command Transport Squad
 42nd Field Post Office

Attached during the invasion of France in 1940:
 LXXXVI CC.NN. Battalion

Attached from 1941 until early 1942:
 86th CC.NN. Legion "Intrepida"
 Command Company
 LXXV CC.NN. Battalion
 LXXXVI CC.NN. Battalion
 86th CC.NN. Machine Gun Company

Military honors 
For their conduct during the campaign in the Soviet Union the President of Italy awarded on 31 December 1947 to the two infantry regiments of the 5th Infantry Division "Cosseria" Italy's highest military honor, the Gold Medal of Military Valour.

  89th Infantry Regiment "Cosseria" on 31 December 1947
  90th Infantry Regiment "Cosseria" on 31 December 1947

Commanding officers 
The division's commanding officers were:

 Generale di Divisione Alberto Vasari (1940 - 19 June 1940)
 Generale di Divisione Umberto Mondadori (acting, 20 June 1940 - 2 September 1940)
 Generale di Divisione Enrico Gazzale (3 September 1940 - July 1943)
 Generale di Divisione Vincenzo Robertiello (July 1943 - 12 September 1943)

Notes

References

External links 
 Regio Esercito: 5a Divisione di fanteria "Cosseria"

Infantry divisions of Italy in World War II
Divisions of Italy of the Second Italo-Ethiopian War
Military units and formations established in 1935
Military units and formations disestablished in 1943